Amy Perrett (born 1990 or 1991) is an Australian professional rugby union referee. She has refereed at the Women's Rugby World Cup, including the final in 2014, as well as the Women's Sevens World Series and Summer Olympics.

Early life
Amy Perrett was raised in Sydney's north. From the age of seven to twelve she played junior rugby in mixed teams alongside her twin brother, Paul. In 2003, when no longer allowed to play against boys and with no girls teams available at the time, Perrett took up rugby refereeing.

Refereeing career
Perrett joined the NSW Referees Association  in 2008 and then began her senior refereeing career.

Within the fifteen-a-side game, Perrett has been a regular appointment to the Women's Six Nations Championship since 2014. She refereed the 2014 Women's World Cup final won by  21–9 against  in Paris.

In 2016, Perrett was the first woman appointed to referee men's teams in Australia's National Rugby Championship, after becoming the first female assistant referee in Super Rugby three months earlier.

Further, in 2020 on the 29th August, Perrett became the first female referee in Super Rugby, refereeing the Brumbies vs the Western Force.

During the 2020 Summer Olympics, she was widely criticised on social media by Fijian fans when she refereed the women's semi-final match between Fiji and New Zealand. The fans claimed that Perrett officiated the match in an unfair way.

References

Australian rugby union referees
Living people
Female rugby union referees
ARU referees
Australian women referees and umpires
Year of birth missing (living people)
Super Rugby referees